Morton Air Services was one of the earliest post-World War II private, independent British airlines formed in 1945. It mainly operated regional short-haul scheduled services within the British Isles and between the United Kingdom and Continental Europe. In 1953, Morton took over rival independent UK airline Olley Air Service. In 1958, Morton became part of the Airwork group. Morton retained its identity following the 1960 Airwork — Hunting-Clan merger that led to the creation of British United Airways (BUA). The reorganisation of the BUA group of companies during 1967/8 resulted in Morton being absorbed into British United Island Airways (BUIA) in 1968.

History
In 1945, former Royal Air Force pilot Captain T.W. "Sammy" Morton founded Morton Air Services. Prior to Morton's inception, "Sammy" Morton had flown scheduled services from London's old Croydon Airport to Paris Le Bourget with Amy Johnson in the 1930s

By the early 1950s, Captain Morton had built up a fleet of Airspeed Consul (see heading image) and De Havilland Dragon Rapide aircraft and these were soon supplemented by more modern de Havilland Dove piston airliners to operate regular charter flights. These included general charter work, air ambulance services and racecourse charters. The latter's regularity was such that it amounted to a "quasi-scheduled" operation. Morton subsequently won traffic rights to operate fully fledged scheduled services from Croydon to the Channel Islands, Deauville, Le Touquet and Rotterdam.

Morton sold a minority stake of about 20% to rival independent airline Skyways. When that airline was taken over by the Lancashire Aircraft Corporation (LAC), another contemporary independent airline, LAC acquired ownership of Skyways's minority holding in Morton Air Services as well.

In 1953, Morton Air Services gained control of its independent rival Olley Air Service. Following the takeover of Olley Air Service, that airline's operations were wholly integrated into Morton's but the Olley name would survive for certain services until 1963.

In 1958, Morton sold out to Airwork. The same year, Airwork started the process of merging with Hunting-Clan to form BUA.

On 30 September 1959, a Morton Air Services de Havilland Heron (G-AOXL) operated the last scheduled passenger flight to depart Croydon. The aircraft was headed for Rotterdam. Another Heron, repainted to represent that aircraft currently (2011) guards the entrance to Croydon's Aerodrome Hotel.) By the following morning, the airline's entire operation — including its headquarters — had been relocated to Gatwick.

Although Morton's scheduled services were integrated into BUA's regional operations following the creation of that airline in July 1960, the Morton name survived until the completion of the BUA group's 1967/8 reorganisation. It finally disappeared on 1 November 1968. This was the day Morton was absorbed into BUIA, BUA's new regional affiliate.

Olley Air Service
In January 1934, Gordon Olley, a former pilot with Handley Page Transport and Imperial Airways, founded Olley Air Service.

Olley Air Service was primarily a charter airline. It headed a group of airlines that included Blackpool & West Coast Air Services, Channel Air Ferries and Isle of Man Air Services. These airlines were taken over in 1935 and 1936. Channel Air Ferries assumed Olley's scheduled air services to and from the Channel Islands, while Blackpool & West Coast Air Services operated scheduled flights between the UK and Ireland as well as to/from the Isle of Man. The former were jointly operated with Aer Lingus using the Irish Sea Airways brand name. The latter transferred to Isle of Man Air Services, following which Blackpool & West Coast Air Services shortened its name to West Coast Air Services.

In 1938, the Olley group formed a new joint venture airline with two contemporary railway companies under the name Great Western & Southern Air Lines.

In 1939, Great Western & Southern Air Lines took over the scheduled routes of Channel Air Ferries.

Following the end of World War II, Olley Air Service resumed operations as a charter airline. It subsequently re-entered the scheduled services market as well.

In 1953, Olley Air Service was sold to Morton Air Services, as a result of which the former was absorbed into the latter. Despite Olley's complete integration into Morton, the Olley name was still used for specific services until 1963.

Fleet 
Morton Air Services and Olley Air Service operated the following aircraft types:

Airspeed Consul
de Havilland DH 89 Dragon Rapide
de Havilland DH 104 Dove
de Havilland DH 114 Heron
Douglas DC-3/C-47

Fleet in 1958
In April 1958, the combined fleet of Morton Air Services and Olley Air Service comprised 14 aircraft.

Accidents and incidents
There are two recorded fatal accidents involving Morton Air Services aircraft.

The first accident occurred on 8 May 1950. It involved an Airspeed Consul (registration: G-AHJX). The aircraft was destroyed in a crash off Guernsey killing all four occupants.
On 14 June 1952, Consul G-AHFT on a charter from Croydon to Le Mans ditched off Brighton following engine problems, all 6 on board killed, including pilot Lawrence Page.

See also
 List of defunct airlines of the United Kingdom

Notes
Notes

Citations

Sources

 (various backdated issues relating to Morton Air Services and Olley Air Service, 1934–1968)

External links
Morton Air Services — In Memoriam
Aviation Safety Network database — Morton Air Services accidents/incidents
airline timetable images — Morton Air Services, United Kingdom
airline timetable images — Olley Air Service, United Kingdom
Morton Air Services de Havilland DH 104 Dove 1B G-ANVC parked at London Gatwick during 1966
Morton Air Services de Havilland DH 114 G-ANSZ Heron 1B on the ramp at London Gatwick on 8 June 1966
Morton Air Services Douglas C-47B Dakota Mk. 4 (DC-3A) on the ramp at London Gatwick during August 1968
Olley Air Service de Havilland DH 89A Dragon Rapide G-ACYR exhibit photographed at Madrid's Cuatro Vientos on 7 August 2004

Defunct airlines of the United Kingdom
Airlines established in 1945
Airlines disestablished in 1968